Dmytro Serhiyovych Lyopa (born 23 November 1988) is a Ukrainian professional footballer who plays as an attacking midfielder plays for Mladost Ždralovi.

Career
In February 2023 he moved to Mladost Ždralovi.

Honours
Puskás Akadémia
 Nemzeti Bajnokság II: 2016–17

References

External links
 
 
 

1988 births
Living people
People from Kremenchuk
Ukrainian footballers
Ukraine youth international footballers
Ukraine under-21 international  footballers
Association football midfielders
FC Dnipro players
FC Kryvbas Kryvyi Rih players
FC Karpaty Lviv players
FC Metalurh Zaporizhzhia players
FC Metalist Kharkiv players
Puskás Akadémia FC players
NK Osijek players
FC VPK-Ahro Shevchenkivka players
Ukrainian Premier League players
Ukrainian First League players
Nemzeti Bajnokság I players
Croatian Football League players
Ukrainian expatriate footballers
Expatriate footballers in Hungary
Ukrainian expatriate sportspeople in Hungary
Expatriate footballers in Croatia
Ukrainian expatriate sportspeople in Croatia
Sportspeople from Poltava Oblast
21st-century Ukrainian people